In fluid dynamics, the Basset–Boussinesq–Oseen equation (BBO equation) describes the motion of – and forces on – a small particle in unsteady flow at low Reynolds numbers. The equation is named after Joseph Valentin Boussinesq, Alfred Barnard Basset and Carl Wilhelm Oseen.

Formulation

The particle moves with Lagrangian velocity  in a fluid of density , dynamic viscosity  and Eulerian velocity field  . The fluid velocity field surrounding the particle consists of the undisturbed, local Eulerian velocity field  plus a disturbance field – created by the presence of the particle and its motion with respect to the undisturbed field  For very small particle diameter the latter is locally a constant whose value is given by the undisturbed Eulerian field evaluated at the location of the particle center, . The small particle size also implies that the disturbed flow can be found in the limit of very small Reynolds number, leading to a drag force given by Stokes' drag. Unsteadiness of the flow relative to the particle results in force contributions by added mass and the Basset force. The BBO equation states:

This is Newton's second law, in which the left-hand side is the rate of change of the  particle's linear momentum, and the right-hand side is the summation of forces acting on the particle. The terms on the right-hand side are, respectively, the:
 Stokes' drag,
 Froude–Krylov force due to the pressure gradient in the undisturbed flow, with  the gradient operator and  the undisturbed pressure field,
 added mass,
 Basset force and
 other forces acting on the particle, such as gravity, etc.

The particle Reynolds number 

has to be less than unity, for the BBO equation to give an adequate representation of the forces on the particle.

Also  suggest to estimate the pressure gradient from the Navier–Stokes equations:

with  the material derivative of  Note that in the Navier–Stokes equations  is the fluid velocity field, while, as indicated above, in the BBO equation  is the velocity of the undisturbed flow as seen by an observer moving with the particle. Thus, even in steady Eulerian flow  depends on time if the Eulerian field is non-uniform.

Notes

References

Equations of fluid dynamics